Sixteen teams participated in the 1982 ICC Trophy, the second edition of the tournament. Five of those teams – Gibraltar, Hong Kong, Kenya, West Africa, and Zimbabwe – were making their tournament debuts.

Bangladesh
Only players who appeared in at least one match at the tournament are listed. The leading run-scorer is marked with a dagger (†) and the leading wicket-taker with a double dagger (‡).

 Anwarul Amin ‡
 Dipu Roy Chowdhury
 Gazi Ashraf
 Jahangir Shah
 Nazam Shirazi
 Omar Khaled
 Rafiqul Alam

 Raqibul Hasan
 Sadhrul Anam
 Samiur Rahman
 Shafiq-ul-Haq
 Tanjeeb Ahsan
 Yousuf Rahman †

Source: ESPNcricinfo

Bermuda
Only players who appeared in at least one match at the tournament are listed. The leading run-scorer is marked with a dagger (†) and the leading wicket-taker with a double dagger (‡).

 Joseph Bailey
 Colin Blades †
 Gladstone Brown
 Allan Douglas
 Noel Gibbons
 Elvin James ‡
 Adrian King

 Steven Lightbourne
 Winston Reid
 Wendell Smith
 Lionel Thomas
 Winston Trott
 John Tucker

Source: ESPNcricinfo

Canada
Only players who appeared in at least one match at the tournament are listed. The leading run-scorer is marked with a dagger (†) and the leading wicket-taker with a double dagger (‡).

 Derek Abraham
 Rawle Cottle
 Stevenson Deare
 Ron Dipchand
 Andre Hakim
 Tariq Javed †
 Farooq Kirmani †

 Malcolm McKenzie
 Clement Neblett
 M. G. Patel
 Tatoo Seebalack
 Danny Singh
 Richard Stevens ‡
 John Vaughan

Source: ESPNcricinfo

East Africa
Only players who appeared in at least one match at the tournament are listed. The leading run-scorer is marked with a dagger (†) and the leading wicket-taker with a double dagger (‡).

 Keith Arnold
 Balraj Bouri
 Bill Bourne
 Derek Capaccioli
 Bipin Desai ‡
 Pravin Desai
 Sajjad Lakha

 M. I. M. Lorgat
 D. C. Patel †
 Dinesh Patel
 Raghuvir Patel
 Vali Tarmohamed
 Narendra Thakker
 Sam Walusimbi

Source: ESPNcricinfo

Fiji
Only players who appeared in at least one match at the tournament are listed. The leading run-scorer is marked with a dagger (†) and the leading wicket-taker with a double dagger (‡).

 Alan Apted
 Cecil Browne
 W. Browne
 Peni Dakainivanua
 Pensioni Gauna ‡
 Metusela Isimeli
 Roderick Jepsen
 Iliaisa Kacisolomone

 Tikiko Korocowiri
 Joeli Mateyawa
 Jack McGoon
 Seremaia Rayasi
 Seci Sekinini
 Jaswant Singh †
 Inoke Tambualevu
 Ilikena Vuli ‡

Source: ESPNcricinfo

Gibraltar
Only players who appeared in at least one match at the tournament are listed. The leading run-scorer is marked with a dagger (†) and the leading wicket-taker with a double dagger (‡).

 Steve Boylan
 Joe Buzaglo
 Tim Buzaglo
 Tom Finlayson
 Charles Head
 K. A. Jacks ‡
 Vince Kenny

 Joseph Olivero
 Lionel Peterson
 Alan Procter
 Willie Scott
 R. Truscott †
 T. W. J. Wright

Source: ESPNcricinfo

Hong Kong
Only players who appeared in at least one match at the tournament are listed. The leading run-scorer is marked with a dagger (†) and the leading wicket-taker with a double dagger (‡).

 Peter Anderson
 Gordon Bacon ‡
 Brian Catton
 Rob Gill
 Des Greenwood
 Gopal Lalchandani
 Andy Lorimer †
 Peter Olsen

 Dermot Reeve
 Martin Sabine
 Rod Starling
 Nigel Stearns
 Bob Toes
 Yarman Vachha
 Steve Waller

Source: ESPNcricinfo

Israel
Only players who appeared in at least one match at the tournament are listed. The leading run-scorer is marked with a dagger (†) and the leading wicket-taker with a double dagger (‡).

 Hillel Awasker
 Aaron Benjamin
 Howard Horowitz
 Barry Kanpol
 Jerrold Kessel
 Alan Moss
 David Moss

 Stanley Perlman †
 Nissam Reuben ‡
 Michael Schwartz
 Isaac Solomon
 Leslie Susser
 Valice Worrell

Source: ESPNcricinfo

Kenya
Only players who appeared in at least one match at the tournament are listed. The leading run-scorer is marked with a dagger (†) and the leading wicket-taker with a double dagger (‡).

 Avinash Chotai
 Bharat Desai
 Suresh Joshi
 Muslim Kanji
 K. S. Mankoo
 Hitesh Mehta †
 Gulam Musa

 Jagdish Patel
 Ramesh Patel
 Abdul Rehman
 Anil Sheikh
 Zahoor Sheikh‡
 Naguib Verjee

Source: ESPNcricinfo

Malaysia
Only players who appeared in at least one match at the tournament are listed. The leading run-scorer is marked with a dagger (†) and the leading wicket-taker with a double dagger (‡).

 Amarjit Singh Gill
 Azmi Majid
 Bhupinder Singh Gill
 Banerji Nair †
 Chan Yow Choy
 Christopher Lewis
 D. Hector
 Harris Abu Bakar

 K. Kamalanathan ‡
 K. Sekar
 Karunakarer Selvaratnam
 Khoo Kim Khuang
 Ranjit Singh
 S. Bell
 Tan Kim Hing
 Zainon Mat

Source: ESPNcricinfo

Netherlands
Only players who appeared in at least one match at the tournament are listed. The leading run-scorer is marked with a dagger (†) and the leading wicket-taker with a double dagger (‡).

 Dik Abed ‡
 David Defoe
 Alex de la Mar
 Ronnie Elferink ‡
 Peter Entrop
 Steven Lubbers

 Cees Ruskamp
 Rene Schoonheim
 Mark van Heijningen
 Rob van Weelde ‡
 Hendrik van Wijk
 Huib Visée

Source: ESPNcricinfo

Papua New Guinea
Only players who appeared in at least one match at the tournament are listed. The leading run-scorer is marked with a dagger (†) and the leading wicket-taker with a double dagger (‡).

 Nigel Agonia
 Vele Amini
 Tau Ao
 La'a Aukopi
 Raki Ila
 Kosta Ilaraki
 Arua Ipi
 Kila Kalo ‡

 Api Leka
 Kula Loi
 William Maha
 Vavine Pala †
 Vele Patu
 Gamu Ravu
 Taunao Vai
 Keimelo Vuivagi

Source: ESPNcricinfo

Singapore
Only players who appeared in at least one match at the tournament are listed. The leading run-scorer is marked with a dagger (†) and the leading wicket-taker with a double dagger (‡).

 Neelan Amarasuriya
 Christopher da Silva
 Abhijit Dass
 Isaac Gnanachandran
 Goh Swee Heng
 Champaklal Kantilal
 Frederick Martens †

 Rex Martens
 Stacey Muruthi
 Roger Oliveiro
 Mohan Rajalingham ‡
 Sitharam Sethivail
 Lawrence Young Ken Sen

Source: ESPNcricinfo

United States
Only players who appeared in at least one match at the tournament are listed. The leading run-scorer is marked with a dagger (†) and the leading wicket-taker with a double dagger (‡).

 Sawar Ahmed
 Masood Akhtar
 Inder Bally
 Shamshad Durrani ‡
 Cyril Ernest
 Neil Lashkari †
 David Millener
 Kamran Rasheed

 B. B. Ramnanan
 John Reid
 Trevor Roberts
 Pete Smythe
 Wayne Stuger
 Kennedy Venkersammy
 Winston Walke

Source: ESPNcricinfo

West Africa
Only players who appeared in at least one match at the tournament are listed. The leading run-scorer is marked with a dagger (†) and the leading wicket-taker with a double dagger (‡).

 Anthony Ayama ‡
 Segun Elliott †
 S. Erukanure
 J. W. F. George
 Ewa Henshaw
 Bode Karunwi ‡
 Sahr Kpundeh

 Edinam Nutsugah ‡
 Jacob Onyechi
 Deji Otegbeye
 Donald Ovberedjo
 Okon Ukpong
 A. Williams

Source: ESPNcricinfo

Zimbabwe
Only players who appeared in at least one match at the tournament are listed. The leading run-scorer is marked with a dagger (†) and the leading wicket-taker with a double dagger (‡).

 Robin Brown
 Iain Butchart
 Kevin Curran †
 Maqbul Dudhia
 Duncan Fletcher
 Jack Heron
 Craig Hodgson

 Vince Hogg
 Edwin Hough
 David Houghton
 Andy Pycroft
 Peter Rawson ‡
 John Traicos
 Gary Wallace

Source: ESPNcricinfo

Sources
 CricketArchive: Averages by teams, ICC Trophy 1982
 ESPNcricinfo: ICC Trophy, 1982 / Statistics

Cricket squads
ICC World Cup Qualifier